= Jamsola =

Jamsola is a village in Odisha, India. Its main industry is agricultural and has seen little to no industrial development. Its education, water and electrical systems have yet to be developed.
